The Fritz Feigl Prize by the Austrian Society of Analytical Chemistry (ASAC) is named after Fritz Feigl. In 2012 it was sponsored by Bruker Corporation.

Recipients
Herbert BALLCZO (Wien) 1950
Gerald KAINZ (Wien) 1950
Hanns MALISSA sen. (Wien) 1950
Hans SPITZY (Graz) 1950
Herbert HABELANDT (Wien) 1951
Hermengild FLASCHKA (Atlanta) 1953
Herbert WEISZ (Wien) 1955
Vinzenz ANGER (Wien) 1961
Lambert OTTENDORFER (Wien) 1963
Werner JÜTTE (Wien) 1970
FRIEDEMANN-BACHLEITNER (Innsbruck) 1970
Ian MARR (Aberdeen) 1970
Wolfgang MERZ (Ludwigshafen) 1970
Hugo ORTNER (Graz) 1970
Manfred GRASSERBAUER (Wien) 1977
Anton BURGER (Innsbruck) 1980
Erich SCHMID (Wien) 1980
Vasil SIMEONOV (Sofia) 1980
Wolfhard WEGSCHEIDER (Graz) 1980
Hans PUXBAUM (Wien) 1987
Otto WOLFBEIS (Graz) 1987
Hans MALISSA jun. (Linz) 1987
Ernst KENNDLER (Wien) 1990
Matthias OTTO (Freiberg) 1990
Gerhard STINGEDER (Wien) 1990
Manfred SCHREINER (Wien) 1993
Wolfgang BUCHBERGER (Linz) 1993
Gernot FRIEDBACHER (Wien) 1996
Günter ALLMAIER (Wien) 1996
Rudolf KRSKA (Tulln) 2000
Peter OEFNER (Stanford) 2002
Bernhard Lendl (Wien) 2003
Thomas PROHASKA (Wien) 2003
Boris MIZAIKOFF (Washington) 2004
Michael LÄMMERHOFER (Wien) 2005
Walter GÖSSLER (Graz) 2006
Christian KLAMPFL (Linz) 2007
Stephan HANN (Wien) 2008
Herbert OBERACHER (Innsbruck) 2009
Hanno STUTZ (Salzburg) 2009
Gunda KÖLLENSPERGER (Wien) 2010
Peter LIEBERZEIT (Wien) 2011

References

Chemistry awards
Austrian science and technology awards